Leyla Piedayesh (born 1970) is an Iranian-born German fashion designer and founder of the Lala Berlin fashion label. She was born in Teheran.

Piedayesh founded Lala Berlin in 2004, originally as a knitwear brand. The line expanded to include a full range of fashion for women, including accessories and knit jackets. The first boutique shop was opened in 2006. In 2007, the label was nominated for the New Generation Award at Merceds-Benz Fashion Week. Piedayesh's designs are now available globally in more than 60 stores. Her lala Berlin company is 100% female. Piedayesh has shown Lala Berlin several times during Copenhagen Fashion Week.

Before becoming a full-time designer, Piedayesh was an editor of the Designerama television segment for MTV Berlin.

In 2015, she was a judge of the Designer Nest Awards during Copenhagen fashion week.

In 2017, as part of International Women's Day, Barbie honored 17 contemporary and historical female role models. Piedayesh became the first German to have a Barbie created in her image.

References 

Living people
1970 births
German fashion designers
Iranian fashion designers
People from Tehran
Date of birth missing (living people)
German women fashion designers
Iranian women fashion designers
German women company founders